Image for Windows may refer to:
 Scion Image for Windows, an image processing software
 TeraByte Unlimited's Image for Windows (disk imaging), a disk imaging backup software